A location within the fictional setting of Narnia.
A location within the fictional Dark Sun setting.